Hotel Ukraina may refer to:

 Hotel Ukraina - the tallest hotel in Europe, and of the Seven Sisters in Moscow
 Hotel Ukraine - a hotel in Kyiv
 Grand Hotel Ukraine, a hotel in Dnipro

See also
 Ukraina (disambiguation)

ru:Украина (гостиница)